The North Branch Meduxnekeag River is a river in Aroostook County, Maine and Carleton County, New Brunswick. 

See also
List of rivers of Maine
List of bodies of water of New Brunswick

References

Maine Streamflow Data from the USGS
Maine Watershed Data From Environmental Protection Agency

Tributaries of the Saint John River (Bay of Fundy)
Rivers of Aroostook County, Maine
Rivers of New Brunswick
Landforms of Carleton County, New Brunswick
International rivers of North America